Una noche sin mañana (English: An evening without morning) is a Mexican telenovela produced by Televisa and broadcast by Telesistema Mexicano in 1961.

Cast 
 Roberto Araya
 Héctor Gómez
 Héctor Godoy
 María Teresa Rivas
 Carmen Salas
 Delia Magaña
 Pilar Sen

References

External links 

Mexican telenovelas
1961 telenovelas
Televisa telenovelas
1961 Mexican television series debuts
1961 Mexican television series endings
Spanish-language telenovelas